Booba (born 1976) is a French rapper. 

Booba may also refer to:

 Booba (film), a 2001 Philippine comedy film
 Booba Barnes, (1936–1996), American guitarist and vocalist
 Booba Starr, Jamaican singer
 Ethel Booba (born 1976), Filipina TV personality, author, singer, and comedian

See also
 Bouba (disambiguation)
 Boba (disambiguation)
 Boohbah
 Buba (disambiguation)
 Booby (disambiguation)